The Santa Lucia riverwalk is an artificial river located in the Mexican city of Monterrey, Nuevo León.

History 
Construction of the river began in 1996, but for economic reasons was stopped for nine years. In 2005, construction continued and was finished in 2007.  It was inaugurated by the Mexican President Felipe Calderon Hinojosa, Nuevo León's governor Natividad González Parás, and Monterrey's mayor Adalberto Madero in celebration of the 197th anniversary of the Mexican War of Independence.

It is one of the most important attractions in the city.  It was also part of the 2007 Universal Forum of Cultures' attractions.

Features 

 It connects the Macroplaza and the Fundidora Park
 It is 1.55 miles long.
 It is 1.2 metres deep.
 It is under 24‑hour surveillance.
 The riverwalk contains several motorboats.
 It also has several fountains.
 It has one of the five authentic Inukshuk outside Canada.
 The whole Riverwalk has free wireless internet access.

Notes

References 

 Inaugura Calderón el Paseo Santa Lucía. El Porvenir, 15 September 2007.
 Paseo Santa Lucía. Gobierno del Estado de Nuevo León.
 Paseo Santa Lucía. Secretaría de Turismo, Ayuntamiento de Monterrey.
 Video virtual. Proyecto de la Secretaría de Obras Públicas del Gobierno del Estado de Nuevo León.

Buildings and structures in Monterrey
Landmarks in Monterrey
Tourist attractions in Monterrey